is a Japanese 1980s pink film actress and model who is best known for her Nikkatsu Roman Porno films in the period 1982–1985.

Career
Watanabe came under exclusive contract with Nikkatsu and made her studio debut as the lead role in an Atsushi Fujiura entry in the ama sex comedy series,  released on 9 July 1982. Watanabe had a prolific Nikkatsu career, playing both lead and supporting roles in a wide range of Roman Porno films. With her athletic build, she was also a popular glamour model and had appearances in "image videos" as well as photo-books.

Filmography

Nikkatsu

Videos

Hong Kong

Photo-books
渡辺良子写真集 光と影, Kindaieigasha, 25 January 1983.
にっかつロマンポルノ女優六人集「ひ・め・ご・と, Tatsumi Publishing, 10 April 1984, featuring Nikkatsu actresses Ryoko Watanabe, Natsuko Yamamoto, Kaoru Oda, Kate Asabuki, Mina Asami, Kaori Okamoto.

External links 
 
 
 Ryoko Watanabe at the JMDB

1961 births
Pink film actors
Japanese female adult models
People from Hamamatsu
Living people